Małgorzata Sobańska-Mańkowska (born April 25, 1969, in Poznań, Wielkopolskie) is a retired female long-distance runner from Poland. She twice competed for her native country at the Summer Olympics: in 1996 and 2004.

Achievements

Personal bests
10,000 metres – 33:52.03 (2004)
Half marathon – 1:11:47 hrs (2008)
Marathon – 2:26:08 hrs (2001)

External links
 
 
 marathoninfo

1969 births
Living people
Polish female long-distance runners
Polish female marathon runners
London Marathon female winners
Athletes (track and field) at the 1996 Summer Olympics
Athletes (track and field) at the 2004 Summer Olympics
Olympic athletes of Poland
Sportspeople from Poznań
Malgorzata
20th-century Polish women
21st-century Polish women